One column containing two treaties between Amyntas III of Macedon and the Chalkidian League has been discovered at Olynthus (the capital of the League). The first treaty is dated in c. 393 BC, the second one before 382 BC. The language of the texts is Ionic Greek, the main dialect of Chalcidice.

Text and translation

Historical background
After the Illyrian invasion of Macedonia in 393 BC, Amyntas was driven out and Argaeus II was installed in the throne. With  the aid of the Thessalian family Aleuadae under Medius, Amyntas recovered his kingdom (Diodorus 14.92.3). To shore up his country against the threat of the Illyrians, Amyntas established an alliance with the Chalkidian League. 

In 383/382 BC the Illyrians invaded again and defeated Amyntas in battle. A present of land was made to the Olynthians by Amyntas III, seeking for help. At that time the League was more powerful; not only did the alliance break down but the Chalcidians actually seized Amyntas' capital of Pella and lands of Macedon (DS 15.19.2; Isok. 6.46; cf. Hammond/Griffith 1979, 174-6). With the help of Sparta, Thessalians, Elimiotes, Iphicrates, Cotys I and city-states in Chalcidice opposing Olynthus, Amyntas recovered his kingdom and the Spartans dissolved the League in 379 BC.  As Justin (7.4.6) states about Amyntas Cum Illyriis deinde et cum Olynthiis gravia bella gessit ... then he made serious wars against the Illyrians and the Olynthians.

Unlike the first treaty, the second one is clearly beneficial to the League rather than Amyntas. Not only concerning the wood exports, which are related to the aims of the maritime League for constructing an effective navy (Amyntas actually would have little interest in wood from Chalcidice or building a navy) but also the third parties mentioned, are all potential enemies of the League and not Amyntas, whose main threat was from the North, the Illyrians.

Notes and references

From the end of the Peloponnesian War to the battle of Ipsus Page 35 By Phillip Harding  (1985)
N. G. L. Hammond  A History of Macedonia: 550-336 B.C. v. 2  - The reign of Amyntas III 393-370/69 -

Ancient Chalcidice
Treaties of Macedon
Texts in Ionic Greek
Greek inscriptions
Old Macedonian kingdom
4th-century BC treaties
Archaeological discoveries in Greece